Russell Arthur Tillman (February 27, 1946 – March 14, 2021) was an American football player who played linebacker in the National Football League for the Washington Redskins from 1970 to 1977.

Tillman was nicknamed “The King” for his special teams mastery.  He played seven different special teams positions and served as special teams captain from 1974 to 1977.  He was a member of Washington’s 1972 NFC Championship squad.

After retiring from football, Tillman stayed in the NFL as an assistant coach for the Seattle Seahawks for 16 years, where he coached special teams, tight ends, linebackers before becoming defensive coordinator.  He also spent time as assistant with Tampa Bay, Oakland, Indianapolis and Minnesota.  He served as head coach of the XFL’s New York/New Jersey Hitmen; uninterested in the sports entertainment approach the league was taking, Tillman mostly took a straight approach to coaching in the league, refusing to get wrapped up in the publicity stunts.  Tillman was called "Gutless Rusty" by WWF announcer and sitting Minnesota Governor Jesse Ventura, who as part of a publicity stunt, came out of his XFL broadcast booth to try to provoke a response from Tillman near the end of the league's week 4 telecast; Tillman turned away and refused to answer him.

Tillman also spent one season assistant coaching a GEJFA team in Washington, the Woodinville Falcons, with head coach John Pike, where his son played. Tillman was a special teams coach in the NFL for the Seattle Seahawks in the 1980s and the Minnesota Vikings under Mike Tice.

He died on March 14, 2021.

Head coaching record

XFL

References

1946 births
2021 deaths
American football linebackers
Washington Redskins players
Minnesota Vikings coaches
National Football League defensive coordinators
New York/New Jersey Hitmen coaches
Northern Arizona Lumberjacks football players
Seattle Seahawks coaches
Indianapolis Colts coaches
Sportspeople from Beloit, Wisconsin
Players of American football from Wisconsin